Virginia Caroline Rappe (July 7, 1891 – September 9, 1921) was an American model and silent film actress. Working mostly in bit parts, Rappe died after attending a party with actor Roscoe "Fatty" Arbuckle, who was accused of manslaughter and rape in connection with her death, though he was ultimately acquitted of both charges.

Early life and career
Virginia Rappe was born in Chicago in 1891 to Mabel Rapp, who died when Virginia was 11. Virginia was then raised by her grandmother.  At 18, she began working as a commercial and art model.

In 1916, Rappe moved to San Francisco to pursue her career as an artist's model. There she met dress designer Robert Moscovitz and they became engaged, but shortly afterward he was killed in a streetcar accident, and Rappe moved to Los Angeles. In early 1917, she was hired by director Fred Balshofer and given a prominent role in his film Paradise Garden, opposite screen star Harold Lockwood. Balshofer hired her again to costar with early drag performer Julian Eltinge and newcomer Rudolph Valentino in Over the Rhine, for which she was awarded the title of "Best Dressed Girl in Pictures". This film was not released until 1920, when Balshofer recut it and released it under the title An Adventuress, and later in 1922, after Rappe's death, as The Isle of Love.

In 1919, Rappe began a relationship with director/producer Henry Lehrman. The couple eventually became engaged and lived together, but in the United States Census of 1920, the young actress is listed as a "Boarder" in Lehrman's home in Los Angeles. Rappe appeared in at least four films for Lehrman: His Musical Sneeze, A Twilight Baby, Punch of the Irish and A Game Lady. However, since many of Lehrman's films are lost, the exact number of roles she performed for him cannot be determined.

Following Rappe's death, rumors arose, supposedly to besmirch her character, that she had given birth in Chicago in 1918 and put the baby in foster care. These rumors were proven false by autopsy.

Death

The circumstances of Rappe's death in 1921 became a Hollywood scandal and were covered widely and sensationalized by the media of the time. During a party held on Labor Day, September 5, 1921, in Roscoe "Fatty" Arbuckle's suite at the St. Francis Hotel in San Francisco, Rappe allegedly suffered a trauma. She died four days later on September 9 from a ruptured bladder and secondary peritonitis. She was buried at Hollywood Cemetery (now Hollywood Forever Cemetery).

The exact events of the party remain unclear, with witnesses relating numerous versions of what happened. It was alleged that Rappe had died as a result of a violent sexual assault by Arbuckle. Arbuckle's accuser, Bambina Maude Delmont, had accompanied Rappe to the party; she had first met Rappe only a few days earlier. Delmont had a police record for extortion, prostitution and blackmail. Subsequent witnesses testified that Rappe had for some time suffered from cystitis, a condition which could have been aggravated by consuming alcohol. Witnesses also testified that Rappe had previously suffered from venereal disease, so there were allegations that her death was brought on by her health rather than by an assault.

After three manslaughter trials, Arbuckle was formally acquitted; his acquittal in the third trial was accompanied by an unprecedented statement of apology from the jury stating, in part, that, "Acquittal is not enough for Roscoe Arbuckle. We feel that a great injustice has been done him… there was not the slightest proof adduced to connect him in any way with the commission of a crime." Nevertheless, Arbuckle's reputation and career were ruined because of the scandal.

Filmography

See also

List of unsolved deaths
Olive Thomas

References

Sources

Further reading

External links

 

Virginia Rappe Home-Page 

Film researcher discusses the Fatty Arbuckle trial
Watch His Musical Sneeze at the Danish Film Institute website

'Fatty' Arbuckle and Hollywood's first scandal

1891 births
1921 deaths
20th-century American actresses
Actresses from Chicago
Actresses from New York City
American female models
American film actresses
American silent film actresses
Burials at Hollywood Forever Cemetery
Deaths from peritonitis
Unsolved deaths in the United States